The Davidson County Solar Farm is a  17.2 megawatt solar power station located in the heart of North Carolina, near the community of Linwood. SunEdison built the array of photovoltaic panels, and Duke Energy buys all the output from the solar farm. The solar farm is located on North Carolina Highway 47, off New Jersey Church Road.

Economics
In mid-May 2008, the Davidson County Board of Commissioners agreed to subsidize the project.  This included $1.8 million to go into land grading and multiple cash payments beginning in July 2009, and going through 2011.  Another $127 million was raised from investors. The solar farm created 80 jobs during construction, and three jobs in order to maintain the power facility. In addition, SunEdison will receive an annual refund of certain taxes pertaining to their various constructions due to modified legislation to include solar energy projects. SunEdison had been looking at an almost ten times larger  piece of land off of Interstate 85 near Lexington, but the owner declined to sell the property. However the company had already spent $134,000 researching to see if that site would work.

Efficiency
One of the driving forces behind the construction of this solar farm, and SunEdison's presence in North Carolina altogether, is due to a state law passed in 2007 that requires public utilities such as Duke Energy to obtain a minimum of 12.5% of their power from renewable energy by 2021. The farm has a rating of 21.5 megawatts, which translates to 18 megawatts of peak AC power. Every year that the solar farm is in use, it will offset 32 million pounds of carbon dioxide.  SunEdison claims that once complete, the power plant will generate enough energy to power more than 2,600 homes. The site uses GPS software to track the sun.

See also

Solar power
Photovoltaics
Solar power in the United States
List of photovoltaic power stations
Renewable energy commercialization

References

External links
SunEdison
Duke Energy

Energy infrastructure completed in 2011
Solar power stations in North Carolina
Buildings and structures in Davidson County, North Carolina
SunEdison